Hamshire-Fannett High School is a public high school located in Hamshire, Texas, United States and classified as a 4A school by the University Interscholastic League (UIL). It is part of the Hamshire-Fannett Independent School District located in western Jefferson County. In 2015, the school was rated "Met Standard" by the Texas Education Agency.

Athletics
The Hamshire-Fannett Longhorns compete in the following sports: Cross Country, Volleyball, Football, Basketball, Soccer, Golf, Tennis, Track, Softball & Baseball

References

External links

Hamshire-Fannett ISD

Schools in Jefferson County, Texas
Public high schools in Texas